Pound Shop Wars is a British factual television series that was first broadcast on BBC One from 7 November 2012 until 30 September 2015. Narrated by Caroline Aherne, the series shows the competition between rival pound shops, focusing on Poundworld. The second series, comprising eight episodes, began on 12 August 2015.

Episode list

Pilot (2012)

Series 1 (2014)

Series 2 (2015)

Reception

Ratings
The first one-off hour-long special episode had a 19.8% audience share. According to overnight figures, "The Battle of the Bra" had a viewing audience of 5.42 million, with 23.7% watching it. The third and fourth episodes had viewing audiences of 19.4% and 16.7% respectively.

Critical reception
Tim Dowling of The Guardian said the series "was not enhanced by Caroline Aherne's jokey narration, and it had more than its fair share of isn't-he-a-character type characters, but it was saved for me by a surprising discovery: the pound shop business is actually pretty interesting." Metro Caroline Westbrook said it "certainly didn't disappoint". Bath Chronicle called the narration "lacklustre" and commented on how boring the series was. Andrew Billen from The Times gave the programme three stars out of five. The Sunday Times said "Full marks to the makers of this documentary, who find a clever and absorbing way to tell the story of the biggest current trend on Britain's high streets."

See also
 Poundland
 99p Stores

References

External links
 
 
 

2012 British television series debuts
2015 British television series endings
BBC television documentaries
English-language television shows
Television shows set in the United Kingdom
Works about retailing